Barringtonia hallieri grows as a small tree up to  tall, with a stem diameter of up to . Habitat is riverine and mixed dipterocarp forests from sea-level to  altitude. B. hallieri is endemic to Borneo.

References

hallieri
Plants described in 1939
Endemic flora of Borneo
Trees of Borneo
Flora of the Borneo lowland rain forests